Adam Krijanovski was a mayor of Chișinău from 1867 to 1869.

In 1836, with the rank of provincial registrar, he served as secretary at the court of Zemstvo in Elisavetgrad, in 1837 - in Bobrynets. In 1867,  the college assessor Adam Krijanovski became the elected mayor, replacing Dimitrie Mincu at this position. In 1869, Pavel Gumalic was appointed in place of Krijanovski.

References 

Mayors of Chișinău